The Aztec or Mexica calendar is the calendrical system used by the Aztecs as well as other Pre-Columbian peoples of central Mexico. It is one of the Mesoamerican calendars, sharing the basic structure of calendars from throughout ancient Mesoamerica.

The Aztec sun stone, also called the calendar stone, is on display at the National Museum of Anthropology in Mexico City.
The calendar consists of a 365-day calendar cycle called  (year count) and a 260-day ritual cycle called  (day count). These two cycles together form a 52-year "century", sometimes called the "calendar round".

Tōnalpōhualli
The  ("day count") consists of a cycle of 260 days, each day signified by a combination of a number from 1 to 13, and one of the twenty day signs. With each new day, both the number and day sign would be incremented: 1 Crocodile is followed by 2 Wind, 3 House, 4 Lizard, and so forth up to 13 Reed, after which the cycle of numbers would restart (though the twenty day signs had not yet been exhausted) resulting in 1 Jaguar, 2 Eagle, and so on, as the days immediately following 13 Reed. This cycle of number and day signs would continue similarly until the 20th week, which would start on 1 Rabbit, and end on 13 Flower. It would take a full 260 days (13×20) for the two cycles (of twenty day signs, and thirteen numbers) to realign and repeat the sequence back on 1 Crocodile.

Day signs
The set of day signs used in central Mexico is identical to that used by Mixtecs, and to a lesser degree similar to those of other Mesoamerican calendars. Each of the day signs also bears an association with one of the four cardinal directions.

There is some variation in the way the day signs were drawn or carved.

Wind and Rain are represented by images of their associated gods,  and  respectively.

Other marks on the stone showed the current world and also the worlds before this one. Each world was called a sun, and each sun had its own species of inhabitants. The Aztecs believed that they were in the Fifth Sun and like all of the suns before them they would also eventually perish due to their own imperfections. Every 52 years was marked out because they believed that 52 years was a life cycle and at the end of any given life cycle the gods could take away all that they have and destroy the world.

The 260 days of the sacred calendar were grouped into twenty periods of 13 days each. The original Nahuatl term is not known.

Each  is named according to the calendar date of the first day of the 13 days in that . In addition, each of the twenty  in the 260-day cycle had its own tutelary deity:

is the Aztec year count. One year consists of 360 named days and 5 nameless. These 'extra' days are thought to be unlucky. The year was broken into 18 periods of twenty days each, sometimes compared to the Julian month. The Nahuatl word for moon is  but whatever name was used for these periods is unknown.

The eighteen  are listed below. The dates are from early eyewitnesses; each wrote what they saw. Both are shown to emphasize the fact that the beginning of the Native new year became non-uniform as a result of an absence of the unifying force of  after the Mexica defeat.

Xiuhmolpilli 
The ancient Mexicans counted their years by means of four signs combined with thirteen numbers, thus obtaining periods of 52 years, which are commonly known as Xiuhmolpilli, a popular but incorrect generic name; the most correct Nahuatl word for this cycle is Xiuhnelpilli. The table with the current years:

Reconstruction of the Solar calendar
For many centuries scholars had tried to reconstruct the Calendar. His correlation argues that the first day of the Mexica year was February 13 of the old Julian calendar or February 23 of the current Gregorian calendar.
A correlation by independent researcher Ruben Ochoa interprets pre-Columbian codices, to reconstruct the calendar, while ignoring most primary colonial sources that contradict this idea, using a method that proposes to connect the year count to the vernal equinox and placing the first day of the year on the first day after the equinox. 

In this regard, José Genaro Emiliano Medina Ramos, a senior native nahua philosopher from San Lucas Atzala in the state of Puebla, proposes a multidisciplinary calendar reconstruction in náhuatl ( ‘centro de Puebla’ variant) according with his own nahua cosmosvision; and relying precisely on Ochoa’s smart correlation and on Tena’s presuppositions as well.  His proposal was translated to Spanish and English, and codified as an academic webpage in 2023.

See also 
 Maya calendar
 Mesoamerican calendars
 Aztec New Year
 Muisca calendar

Notes

References

External links
The Aztec Calendar - Ancient History Encyclopedia
 Detailed description of the temalacatl from Mexico's 
Daily Aztec Calendar
Aztec Calendar Ruben Ochoa Correlation
tlahtolcuepalli itech tonalamatl gregoriano itech mexihca tonalamatl / Convertidor calendario gregoriano -> sistema calendárico mexica / Gregorian calendar -> mexica calendrical system converter

Calendar
 
Calendar
Obsolete calendars